The 2021 ITTF World Youth Championships were held in Vila Nova de Gaia, Portugal, from 2 to 8 December 2021. It was the first edition of the ITTF World Youth Championships, which replaced the World Junior Championships in the ITTF calendar.

Medal summary

Events

Under-19

Under-15

Medal table

See also
2021 World Table Tennis Championships

References

External links
ITTF World Youth Championships

World Junior Table Tennis Championships
Youth World Championships
World Youth Table Tennis Championships
Table Tennis
Table tennis competitions in Portugal
International sports competitions hosted by Portugal
World Youth Table Tennis Championships